The 1990 Tippeligaen was the 46th completed season of top division football in Norway. The season began on 28 April 1990 and ended on 7 October 1990.

Twenty-two games were played with 3 points given for each win and 1 for each draw. Number eleven and twelve were relegated. The winners of the two groups of the 2. divisjon was promoted, as well as the winner of a series of play-off matches between the two second placed teams in the two groups of the 2. divisjon and number ten in Tippeligaen.

This was the first year the top flight of Norwegian football would be called Tippeligaen, from its sponsor, Norsk Tipping. However, the league was still unofficially known by its former name 1. divisjon in the general public. And by the end of the season, it was decided to let the second level of Norwegian football inherit the name 1. divisjon from the 1991 season to strengthen Tippeligaen as a brand.

Teams and locations
''Note: Table lists in alphabetical order.

League table

Results

Relegation play-offs
The qualification matches were contested between Lillestrøm (10th in Tippeligaen), Bryne (2nd in the 2. divisjon - Group A), and Eik-Tønsberg (2nd in the 2. divisjon - Group B). Lillestrøm won and stayed in Tippeligaen.

Results
Match 1: Bryne 5–1 Eik-Tønsberg
Match 2: Eik-Tønsberg 1–3 Lillestrøm
Match 3: Lillestrøm 2–0 Bryne

Table

Season statistics

Top scorers

Attendances

References

External links
League table
Fixtures
Goalscorers

Eliteserien seasons
Norway
Norway
1